Kuiying Subdistrict is a subdistrict in Zhongshan District, Dalian, Liaoning, China. , it has 14 residential communities under its administration:

Communities:
Xiangyang Community
Shikui Community
Qingquan Community
Qingyun Community
Guanghua Community
Wenhua Community
Kuiying Community
Zhiren Community
Linhai Community
Wuhan Community
Duli Community
Huachang Community
Lüshan Community
Wuchang Community

In 2019, Kunming Subdistrict was abolished, its former administrative area merged into Kuiying Subdistrict.

See also
List of township-level divisions of Liaoning

References

Township-level divisions of Liaoning
Dalian
Subdistricts of the People's Republic of China